Slate Creek is a stream in the U.S. state of South Dakota. It is a tributary of Rapid Creek.

Slate Creek was named for its slate creek bed.

See also
List of rivers of South Dakota

References

Rivers of Pennington County, South Dakota
Rivers of South Dakota